Mount Frost is a mountain, 2,350 m, in the Churchill Mountains of Antarctica, standing 4 nautical miles (7 km) south of Mount Zinkovich, at the south side of the head of Silk Glacier. Named by Advisory Committee on Antarctic Names (US-ACAN) for Lieutenant Colonel Foy B. Frost, United States Air Force (USAF), commanding officer of the Ninth Troop Carrier Squadron, which furnished C-124 Globemaster airlift support between New Zealand and the Antarctic and from McMurdo Sound inland to Byrd, Eights, and South Pole Stations during U.S. Navy Operation Deepfreeze 1962.

References

Mountains of Oates Land